Sivaram Murthy from the Indian Institute of Technology- Madras, Chennai, Tamil Nadu, India was named Fellow of the Institute of Electrical and Electronics Engineers (IEEE) in 2012 for contributions to resource management in high performance real-time computing and communication systems.

References 

Fellow Members of the IEEE
Living people
Engineers from Tamil Nadu
Year of birth missing (living people)